East Week (Jyutping: dung1 zau1 hon1) is a Hong Kong-based weekly Chinese language magazine which was established by Oriental Press Group (the publisher of Oriental Daily News) on 29 October 1992 and sold to the Emperor Group in September 2001. It is now owned by Sing Tao News Corporation (former name: Global China Group Holdings), and published by China Touch Media Solutions & Services Limited.

Development
Upon its establishment, East Week has been viewed as the direct competitor against Next Magazine of Next Media Limited. However, East Week could not beat Next Magazine throughout the years as Next Magazine still remained as the top-sold magazine with around 150 thousand publications for each issue. So, Ma Ching Fat, Chairman of Oriental Group, finally decided to sell the magazine to Emperor Group, owned by Albert Yeung.

After Yeung had taken over East Week, a revolution of the magazine took place. There was a significant change in the type of news story and the reporting method. Since it took advantage of the "freedom of democracy", it always used very sensational and controversial topics to attract customers. It reported stories like the sex life of the businessman Law Siu Fai and the extramarital affairs of David Li Kwok-po. Such stories became the gossip of the town after the reporting and aroused huge public awareness. However, its way of reporting such news has stirred up fierce social echoes. Law Siu Fai alleged that he had been cheated him in this issue. Also, Donald Tsang, the Chief Secretary of the HKSAR Government, was angry with a news story in which his old chef was interviewed. This is because his private life was reported in that interview without his approval. At last, East Week apologized to the public and Donald Tsang, and paid 120 thousand Hong Kong dollars to Tsang as compensation, to avoid a lawsuit.

Another major incident occurred on 29 October 2002, the day of the publication's 10th anniversary, when the issue published a nude photo of famous Hong Kong actress Carina Lau. It was believed to have been taken forcibly when she was abducted 12 years ago. The issue was sold out that same afternoon, and its secondhand price hiked to $50-$100 with none left in stock.

The lack of media ethics outraged the public, entertainment professionals, women's rights groups and government officials. Massive protests broke out in the days that followed and attacked the immorality of the magazine. Jackie Chan condemned the press in Hong Kong as immoral and nearly all made up of paparazzi, only there to pry into the private lives of celebrities and find scandals for profit. Carina Lau was praised for her courage to come forward and speak publicly at the rally.

Under immense pressure, Yeung had to shut down operations on 1 November 2002. The scandal resulted in a temporary suspension of the 10-year-long publication. While East Week apologized for its actions, the controversy of "freedom of press" raged on. Hong Kong police opened a criminal investigation that led to the arrests of several employees involved.

On 3 September 2003, East Week was back on sale in the market with a renewed image to become an apparent rival of the entertainment magazines. The publication's ownership had switched from Albert Yeung's Emperor Group to Charles Ho Tsu Kwok's's Global China Group Holdings Limited, which has its influence over several local newspapers, such as Sing Tao Daily and Hong Kong Standard. Mr. Ho Kwok Fai, CEO of China Touch, said that Mr. Lai Ting Yiu, who was the Executive Chief Editor of Sing Tao News Corporation, had been appointed as the Editor-in-Chief of East Week to oversee the overall operations and editorial matters. The acquisition of East Week was because of its great business potential. It had grasped a wide readership base and support from advertisers in the past ten years. It was believed that the new East Week would be capable of capturing a noteworthy market share after its re-launch. Ho Kowk Fai added that the investment to East Week was about 40 to 50 million Hong Kong dollars. Any money loss of the first four issues would be borne by a well-known supermarket chain, but its name was undisclosed. He expected that the company would start to make a profit within 1.5 to 2 years.

Besides ownership, East Week also seeks change in terms of editorial positioning. According to the official website, a balanced and objective approach would be adopted. Coverage of celebrity news would also aim to be more content-driven. Its task is to reveal the truth and concerns of all Hong Kong people. Ho Tsu Kowk said whether East Week entered the China market would depend on the regulations and laws of the mainland government.

With a new design and layout, the first issue of the revived magazine on 3 September 2003 featured Carina Lau, the actress of former controversy, in a discussion of her new movie, Infernal Affairs II, and Anita Mui, in a discussion of her seeking a famous oncologist.

Publishing details
East Week is published every Wednesday, in three sections:
Entertainment
Political, Social and Financial Issues
Discovering Food in Hong Kong.

The cover price is HK$20.

A condensed edition of East Week (one book) is included every Saturday or Sunday in Sing Tao Daily's overseas editions.

See also
 Media in Hong Kong

References

External links 
 East Week's homepage
 Hong Kong Journalist Association
 The University of Hong Kong Journalism & Media Studies
 NPF Commentary

Celebrity magazines
Magazines established in 1992
Magazines published in Hong Kong
Sing Tao News Corporation
Weekly magazines published in Hong Kong